Alfbach may refer to the following rivers in Germany:
 Alf (river), a left tributary of the Moselle
 Alfbach (Prüm), a right tributary of the Prüm